Stalag IV-F was a German World War II prisoner-of-war camp in Hartmannsdorf bei Chemnitz, Saxony.

Camp history
Opened in February 1941, the camp held mainly French troops captured during the battle of France, and British captured in North Africa. The POWs were assigned to various Arbeitskommando ("Work detachments") locally. The camp was liberated by American forces in March 1945.

See also
 List of prisoner-of-war camps in Germany

References

Bibliography
 Elvio Carnaghi and Andrea Balzarotti, L'inferno nascosto, ed. Zeisciu, Magenta 2022, ISBN 9788887405644

External links
 Pegasus Archive : Stalag IVF
 Wartime Memories Project : Stalag 4F

World War II prisoner of war camps in Germany